The Avro 701 Athena is a British advanced trainer aircraft built by Avro in the late 1940s. It was designed to replace the North American Harvard in the Royal Air Force, but was bought only in small numbers, the competing Boulton Paul Balliol being preferred.

Design and development
The Athena was designed to meet the requirements of Air Ministry Specification T.7/45 for a three-seat advanced trainer powered by a turboprop engine for the RAF. The Athena was an all-metal low-winged monoplane, with a side-by-side cockpit.  The Air Ministry rethought its requirements in 1947 and replaced the original specification with Specification T.14/47, which specified the use of a Rolls-Royce Merlin 35 piston engine, large stocks of which were held in store.

Despite the change in specification, the first three prototypes were of the turboprop-powered Athena T.1, the first of which, powered by an Armstrong Siddeley Mamba engine, flew on 12 June 1948 at Woodford Aerodrome. The Merlin-powered Athena T.2 first flew on 1 August 1948, and was evaluated against the similar Boulton Paul Balliol.

A small production run of 15 Athenas was ordered for the RAF, but the Balliol was preferred, and no further Athenas were ordered.

Operational history
The 15 production Athenas were used by the RAF from 1950  for armament training at the RAF Flying College at RAF Manby. A single aircraft was loaned back to Avro and given the civil registration G-ALWA for a demonstration tour of India. No sales resulted and it was returned to the RAF.

Variants
Athena T.Mk.1
Turboprop-powered prototype. One  Armstrong Siddeley ASM.3 Mamba engine. Two built.
Athena T.Mk.1A
Single prototype powered by  Rolls-Royce RDa.1 Dart engine. Second prototype to fly.
Athena T.Mk.2
Trainer to Spec. T.14/47 powered by  Rolls-Royce Merlin 35. Four prototypes plus 15 production.

Operators

Royal Air Force
 Aircraft Instrument Experimental Unit, Martlesham Heath (one T2 in 1951)
 Central Flying School, Little Rissington (two T2s 1949-1950)
 Empire Test Pilot's School, Farnborough (one T2 development aircraft)
 Royal Aircraft Establishment (two aircraft)
 RAF College at Manby (ten aircraft 1950-1955)

Accidents and incidents
Two of the 22 aircraft were lost in flying accidents:
 T2 VR569 of the Aircraft Instrument Experimental Unit was written off at Wilby, Suffolk on 27 June 1951. Aircraft broke up in spiral dive after loss of control in cloud, two crew killed.
 T2 VR570 crashed before delivery on 20 March 1950.

Specifications (Athena T.2)

See also

References

1940s British military trainer aircraft
Athena
Low-wing aircraft
Single-engined tractor aircraft